Robert Cord Phelps (born January 23, 1987) is an American former professional baseball infielder. He has played in Major League Baseball (MLB) for the Cleveland Indians and Baltimore Orioles.

Early life
Phelps attended Santa Barbara High School and played collegiate baseball for the Stanford Cardinal and spent three years with them. He finished his college career with a .307 batting average and 115 runs scored. The Cleveland Indians selected him in the third round of the 2008 Major League Baseball Draft.

Professional career

Cleveland Indians
Phelps began his professional career with the Mahoning Valley Scrappers for 25 games in 2008, then spent the 2009 season with the Kinston Indians. In 130 games for them, he had a .261 batting average and 17 stolen bases. Phelps split the 2010 season between the Akron Aeros and Columbus Clippers, and had a .317 average with the Clippers in 66 games. He started 2011 with the Clippers, and in 97 games had a .294 average.

Phelps was called up to the majors for the first time on June 8, 2011. On June 19, Phelps hit his first career major league home run, a walk-off in the 11th inning against Pittsburgh Pirates reliever Tim Wood. Phelps played a total of 53 games during his three seasons with the Indians, primarily spending that time with the Clippers. He was designated for assignment on November 20, 2013.

Baltimore Orioles
After being designated for assignment, Phelps was claimed off waivers by the Baltimore Orioles on November 25, 2013, as part of their attempt to replace Brian Roberts and give themselves depth in the infield. After being picked up by the Orioles, he was slated to begin the 2014 season with the AAA Norfolk Tides. On August 24, 2014, after playing in three games for the Orioles, they designated Phelps for assignment, and he returned to Norfolk, where he had spent the 2014 season.

Philadelphia Phillies
Phelps signed a minor league deal with the Philadelphia Phillies on November 25, 2014. He became a free agent on November 6, 2015.

References

External links

1987 births
Living people
Cleveland Indians players
Baltimore Orioles players
Stanford Cardinal baseball players
Gulf Coast Indians players
Mahoning Valley Scrappers players
Kinston Indians players
Akron Aeros players
Columbus Clippers players
Peoria Javelinas players
Norfolk Tides players
Lehigh Valley IronPigs players
Major League Baseball infielders